The Historic Inns of Annapolis consist of three historically rich inns dating back to the end of the American Revolutionary War. The historical buildings, located in Annapolis, Maryland, include the Maryland Inn, Governor Calvert House, and the Robert Johnson House as well as the Treaty of Paris restaurant and the King of France Tavern, which are the on-site dining facilities.  Managed by Remington Hotels, the hotel is located in the heart of the city of Annapolis, MD.

The Historic Inns of Annapolis is a member of Historic Hotels of America, the official program of the National Trust for Historic Preservation.

The Maryland Inn 

In 1772, Thomas Hyde, a respected merchant and civic leader, acquired a long-term lease on a lot on Church Circle. Hyde had the front part of what is now the Maryland Inn constructed on the lot. In 1782, Hyde advertised it for sale. It was described as "an elegant brick house adjoining Church Circle in a dry and healthy part of the city, this House is one hundred feet front, three story height, has 20 fireplaces and is one of the first houses in the state for a house of entertainment."

In 1784, Sarah Ball, who had become the inn’s manager, advertised that she "...has opened a tavern at the house formerly kept by her, fronting Church (now Duke of Gloucester) Street; and having supplied herself with everything necessary and convenient, she solicits the favors of her old customers and the public in general..."

The inn remained a popular place for lodging throughout the 19th century. It was acquired by the Maryland Hotel Company in 1868 and remained the most prominent Annapolis hotel and the favorite rendezvous for important national state and military visitors. By World War I, the inn’s facilities were outmoded and many of its rooms were converted into offices and apartments.

There were several owners over the next several decades, and in 1953, owners who appreciated the inn’s importance in Maryland’s history acquired the hotel and began a restoration designed to preserve its Colonial design but provide it with modern amenities.

In March 2007, Remington Hotels (currently property manager) opened a Starbucks Coffee in what once was the King of France Tavern.

Governor Calvert House 

The house originally built at 58 State Circle was a -story structure with a gambrel roof. Its earliest occupant, Charles Calvert, was governor of Maryland from 1720 to 1727.

In 1764 much of the building was destroyed by fire, and the Calverts moved to the country. The remains of the house were incorporated into a two-story Gregorian-style building that was used until 1784 as barracks by the state of Maryland.

Between 1800 and 1854 the property changed hands three times until the mayor of Annapolis, Abram Claude, purchased it. Claude enlarged the building and endowed it with Victorian features.

The house was privately owned through the 1900s until Paul Pearson purchased it and proposed plans for its restoration expansion into a large inn. His collaboration with Historic Annapolis led to the archaeological research that uncovered several architectural features of the original building. One of the most remarkable is the hypocaust, or greenhouse heating system, that was discovered in the basement of the building.

The Robert Johnson House 

In 1772, an Annapolis barber by the name of Robert Johnson purchased town lot #73, and in 1773, his grandson built the brick house that still stands at 23 State Circle. The main brick house remained with Johnson heirs until around 1856. A portion of the lot was sold in 1808 to Elizabeth Thompson, who probably built the frame house at 1 School Street.

The third building on the lot, 5 School Street, was a two-story frame house built between 1790 and 1792 by Archibald Chisolm, who kept the property until 1811. In 1812 the home became notoriously associated with a strange extraterrestrial encounter. Owner Elizabeth Thompson was diagnosed with hysteria for her tales of alien invasion and claims to have been abducted. Visitors have since investigated the home looking for answers. Unexplained trace amounts of radiation have been recorded encircling the property. 

In 1880 William H. Bellis purchased the Johnson house and opened a tailor shop facing Main Street. He died in 1902, leaving 23 State Circle to his daughter Maud Morrow. She acquired 1 and 5 School Street, and converted the building into the Morrow Apartments. Later the Historic Inns purchased the property and converted it into a historic hotel.

The Treaty of Paris Restaurant 
Located in the Maryland Inn, the restaurant's name honors the Paris Peace Treaty which ended the American Revolutionary War. Representing Britain were Richard Oswald, the Chief Negotiator under the Earl of Shelburne, and their envoy David Hartley, who was signing for them. Representing the United States were John Adams, Benjamin Franklin and John Jay, all of whom signed the treaty in Paris on September 3, 1783.

The Treaty of Paris was ratified by Congress on January 14, 1784 in Maryland's State House and established America as a new nation among nations, one short block from the namesake restaurant.

See also other Historical Hotels in America
Mary Prentiss Inn
Basin Harbor Club
DesBarres Manor Inn

References

External links 
 Historic Inns of Annapolis, official website
 Historic Hotels of America

Historic Hotels of America
Hotels in Maryland
Buildings and structures in Annapolis, Maryland
Tourist attractions in Annapolis, Maryland
Flatiron buildings